Devil's Revenge is a 2019 American horror film directed by Jared Cohn and starring Jeri Ryan, William Shatner and Jason Brooks.

Plot
John Brock is a down-on-his-luck archaeologist who returns from an expedition to the caves of rural Kentucky after unsuccessfully trying to locate a mysterious relic that his family has sought for generations. Upon his return, John starts to see dream-like visions of a ferocious bird-like creature from ancient folklore. John soon learns that the cave he came into contact with on his last expedition was indeed the cave that contains the relic and also a portal to Hell and a place of worship for the Occult. John discovers that the only way to stop the increasingly realistic visions is to go back to the cave with his family, find the relic once and for all, and destroy it.

Cast
Jason Brooks as Sergio
William Shatner as Hayes
Jeri Ryan as Susan
Brendan Wayne as Paul
Phillip Andre Botello as R.J.
Ciara Hanna as Dana
Robert Scott Wilson as Eric

Production
In addition to acting in the film, Shatner co-wrote the screenplay with Maurice Hurley.

The film was shot in Louisville, Kentucky.

Release
The film was released via video-on-demand on October 1, 2019.  Afterwards, the film was released on DVD and Blu-ray on October 22 that same year.

Reception
Phil Hoad of The Guardian gave the film one star out of five: "No opportunity for deadweight exposition or cornball reversals goes unexplored as William Shatner attempts to destroy an ancient jinxed relic in this bizarre horror-thriller". Bobby LePire of Film Threat gave the film a 9 out of 10.

References

External links
 
 

2019 films
American horror films
2019 horror films
Films shot in Kentucky
2010s English-language films
Films directed by Jared Cohn
2010s American films